Ernstia is a genus of calcareous sponges in the family Clathrinidae. The genus was erected in 2013 to contain five species previously assigned to Clathrina. The genus name honors German naturalist Ernst Haeckel for his contributions towards sponge taxonomy and phylogeny.

Species
 Ernstia adunca Fontana, Cóndor-Luján, Azevedo, Pérez & Klautau, 2018
 Ernstia arabica Voigt, Erpenbeck & Wörheide, 2017
 Ernstia chrysops Van Soest & De Voogd, 2015
 Ernstia citrea Azevedo, Padua, Moraes, Rossi, Muricy & Klautau, 2017
 Ernstia cordata (Haeckel, 1872)
 Ernstia gracilis (Haeckel, 1872)
 Ernstia indonesiae Van Soest & De Voogd, 2015
 Ernstia klautauae Van Soest & De Voogd, 2015
 Ernstia laxa (Kirk, 1896)
 Ernstia minoricensis (Lackschewitz, 1886)
 Ernstia multispiculata Azevedo, Padua, Moraes, Rossi, Muricy & Klautau, 2017
 Ernstia naturalis Van Soest & De Voogd, 2015
 Ernstia quadriradiata (Klautau & Borojevic, 2001)
 Ernstia rocasensis Azevedo, Padua, Moraes, Rossi, Muricy & Klautau, 2017
 Ernstia sagamiana (Hôzawa, 1929)
 Ernstia sanctipauli Azevedo, Padua, Moraes, Rossi, Muricy & Klautau, 2017
 Ernstia septentrionalis (Rapp, Klautau & Valentine, 2001)
 Ernstia solaris Azevedo, Padua, Moraes, Rossi, Muricy & Klautau, 2017
 Ernstia tetractina (Klautau & Borojevic, 2001)

References

 
Clathrinidae